The God in the Garden is a 1921 British silent comedy film directed by Edwin J. Collins and starring Edith Craig, Arthur Pusey and Mabel Poulton. In the film, Cupid brings love to anyone who enters a spinster's garden. The story was based on Keble Howard's 1904 novel of the same name.

The production was filmed in Teddington, close to the River Thames. Keble Howard visited during filming and gave advice on the storyline.

Cast
 Edith Craig as Miss Carroway 
 Arthur Pusey as Rev. Mr. Hatch 
 Mabel Poulton as Stella 
 Mabel Archdall as Alicia Snitterfield 
 James English as Mr. Snitterfield 
 Beatrice Grosvenor as Jane Box 
 Cecil Morton York
 A. Harding Steerman

References

Bibliography
 Gifford, Denis. The British Film Catalogue. Fitzroy Dearborn, 2001. 
 Keble Howard. My Motley Life. Ernest Benn Ltd, 1927. 
 Low, Rachael. History of the British Film, 1918-1929. George Allen & Unwin, 1971.

External links
The God in the Garden at the BFI's Screenonline

1921 films
1921 comedy films
British silent feature films
British comedy films
Films directed by Edwin J. Collins
Butcher's Film Service films
1920s English-language films
1920s British films
Silent comedy films